George Rushing Kempf (Globe, Arizona, August 12, 1944 – Lawrence, Kansas, July 16, 2002) was a mathematician who worked on algebraic geometry, who proved the Riemann–Kempf singularity theorem, the Kempf–Ness theorem, the Kempf vanishing theorem, and who introduced Kempf varieties.

Mumford on Kempf
'I met George in 1970 when he burst on the algebraic geometry scene with a spectacular PhD thesis. His thesis gave a wonderful analysis of the singularities of the subvarieties  of the Jacobian of a curve obtained by adding the curve to itself  times inside its Jacobian. This was one of the major themes that he pursued throughout his career: understanding the interaction of a curve with its Jacobian and especially to the map from the -fold symmetric product of the curve to the Jacobian.

'One of the things that distinguished his work was the total mastery with which he used higher cohomology. A paper which, I believe, every new student of algebraic geometry should read, is his elementary proof of the Riemann-Roch theorem on curves: “Algebraic Curves” in Crelle, 1977. That such an old result could be treated with new insight was the work of a master.' – David Mumford

References

External links
 George Rushing Kempf

1944 births
2002 deaths
20th-century American mathematicians
21st-century American mathematicians
Algebraic geometers
Johns Hopkins University alumni
University of Illinois Urbana-Champaign alumni
Columbia University alumni
Johns Hopkins University faculty
People from Lawrence, Kansas
People from Baltimore
People from Globe, Arizona
Mathematicians from Arizona